Christopher J. Scarver Sr. (born July 6, 1969) is an American convicted triple-murderer who is best-known for murdering his fellow inmates Jeffrey Dahmer, a serial killer, and Jesse Anderson, a murderer, at the Columbia Correctional Institution in 1994. Scarver used a 20-inch (51 cm) metal bar which he had removed from a piece of exercise equipment in the prison weight room to beat and fatally wound Dahmer and Anderson. Scarver was sentenced to two further life sentences for the murders of Dahmer and Anderson, after being sentenced to life in prison for the murder of Steve Lohman in 1990.

Early life
Scarver is the second of five children and was born and raised in Milwaukee, Wisconsin. He attended James Madison High School before dropping out in the eleventh grade, and was eventually kicked out of his mother's house after becoming addicted to alcohol and marijuana. Scarver was hired as a trainee carpenter at a Wisconsin Conservation Corps job program. He said that he had been promised by his supervisor, Edward Patts, that upon completion of this program he would be hired full-time, but Patts was dismissed, and as a result, Scarver's full-time position never materialized. This resulted in Scarver drinking heavily, and while in his drunken state, he began to hear voices calling him the "chosen one". He was later diagnosed with schizophrenia and was said to have been suffering from messianic delusions.

Murder of Steve Lohman
On June 1, 1990, Scarver went to the Wisconsin Conservation Corps training program office and found site manager John Feyen and employee Steve Lohman present. Forcing Lohman down at gunpoint, Scarver demanded money from Feyen. Upon receiving only US$15 from him, the enraged Scarver shot Lohman once in the head, killing him. According to authorities, Scarver then said: "Now do you think I'm kidding? I need more money." After shooting Lohman twice more, both post-mortem, Feyen finally wrote Scarver a US$3,000 check. As Feyen then fled to his car outside, Scarver fired at him but missed.

In 1992, Scarver was convicted and sentenced to life in prison and sent to the Columbia Correctional Institution in Portage, Wisconsin.

Murders of Jesse Anderson and Jeffrey Dahmer
Two years later, on the morning of November 28, 1994, Scarver was assigned to a work detail with two other inmates: Jesse Anderson, serving time for the murder of his wife; and Jeffrey Dahmer, a cannibalistic serial killer. The detail included him cleaning the prison gymnasium toilet. When corrections officers left the three unsupervised, Scarver attacked Jeffrey Dahmer with a metal bar that he had removed from a piece of exercise equipment in the prison weight room; he then beat Jesse Anderson with a wooden stick at the showers. He returned to his cell and informed a corrections officer: "God told me to do it. Jesse Anderson and Jeffrey Dahmer are dead."

Both men were mortally wounded by the beatings. Dahmer was declared dead an hour after arriving at the hospital, and Anderson died two days later after doctors removed him from life support. After being found competent enough to stand trial, Scarver received two more life sentences for Dahmer and Anderson's murders. It is believed that Scarver murdered Dahmer and Anderson, who were both white, because of Dahmer's murders of black males, and because Anderson had stabbed his wife to death and then attempted to frame two black males as the perpetrators of the attack. Scarver was quoted as having said: "Nothing white people do to blacks is just."

Aftermath
In 1995, Scarver was transferred into the custody of the Federal Bureau of Prisons under the register number #08157-045. At the time, prison officials in Wisconsin believed they did not have a facility secure enough to house Scarver. Scarver underwent psychiatric evaluation at MCFP Springfield and was later transferred to ADX Florence, the federal supermax in Florence, Colorado, where he remained until 2000.    

In 2000, Scarver was transferred to the Wisconsin Secure Program Facility when it opened.

In 2001, federal district court judge Barbara Crabb ordered that Scarver and about three dozen other seriously mentally ill inmates be relocated from the Wisconsin facility. Scarver was eventually relocated to the Centennial Correctional Facility in Colorado.

In 2005, Scarver brought a federal civil rights suit against officials of the Wisconsin Secure Program Facility in which he argued that he had been subjected to cruel and unusual punishment, contrary to his constitutional rights. A district court judge dismissed the suit against several of the defendants and ruled that the actions of the remaining officials could not be considered unlawful. Scarver unsuccessfully appealed against the decision in 2006. Scarver would later state that he spent 16 years in solitary confinement as a result of the murders of Dahmer and Anderson. 

In 2012, an agent representing Scarver announced that Scarver was willing to write a tell-all book about the murder of Dahmer.

See also
 List of homicides in Wisconsin

References

External links
Court TV's Crime Library
The Child Left Behind, The Words and Poetry of Christopher J. Scarver (old site, archived May 20, 2015)
Christopher J. Scarver blog

1969 births
Living people
1990 murders in the United States
1994 murders in the United States
20th-century American criminals
African-American people
African-American Christians
American carpenters
American male criminals
American murderers
American people convicted of murder
American prisoners sentenced to life imprisonment
Crime in Milwaukee
Crime in Wisconsin
Criminals from Wisconsin
Jeffrey Dahmer
Male murderers
People convicted of murder by Wisconsin
People from Milwaukee
People with schizophrenia
Prisoners sentenced to life imprisonment by Wisconsin
Inmates of ADX Florence